Eduard Steuermann (June 18, 1892 in Sambor, Austro-Hungarian Empire – November 11, 1964 in New York City) was an Austrian (and later American) pianist and composer.

Steuermann studied piano with Vilém Kurz at the Lemberg Conservatory and Ferruccio Busoni in Berlin, and studied composition with Engelbert Humperdinck and Arnold Schoenberg. He played the piano part in the first performance of Schoenberg's Pierrot Lunaire and premiered his Piano Concerto. He continued his association with Schoenberg as a pianist for the composer's Society for Private Musical Performances in Vienna, and made an arrangement for piano trio of Schoenberg's Verklärte Nacht. He performed in the radio premiere of Schoenberg's "Ode to Napoleon Bonaparte" with the New York Philharmonic under Artur Rodziński on November 26, 1944. In 1952 he was awarded the Schoenberg Medal by the International Society for Contemporary Music. He taught at the Internationale Ferienkurse für Neue Musik at Darmstadt.

Steuermann, whose parents were non-practising Jews, emigrated to the United States in 1938 to escape the anti-Semitic policies of Nazi Germany. He was famed for his Beethoven recitals of the 1950s and was a distinguished teacher, teaching at the Juilliard School from 1952 to 1964. In America he was known as Edward Steuermann. Among the prominent performers who studied with Steuermann are Alfred Brendel, Jakob Gimpel, Moura Lympany, Menahem Pressler, Stephen Pruslin, Avraham Sternklar, Russell Sherman, and Beatrice Witkin. He also taught philosopher Theodor W. Adorno, composer Gunther Schuller and theorists Edward T. Cone and David Lewin.

In 1964 he died of leukemia. In 1989, the University of Nebraska Press published a collection of Steuermann's writings entitled, The Not Quite Innocent Bystander: Writings of Edward Steuermann. The book was co-edited by Clara Steuermann, David H. Porter and Gunther Schuller.

A major work by Steuermann, Variations for Orchestra, is published (large score available) by Philharmusica Co., New York.

The actress and screenwriter Salka Viertel was his sister. The footballer Zygmunt Steuermann was his younger brother. Steuermann married Clara Silvers, a pianist and noted music librarian, in 1949.

Notes

Further reading

External links
 Photographs of Steuermann, his siblings, with Schönberg and others, and a concert program with Steuermann's and Schönberg's works

1892 births
1964 deaths
People from Sambir
Austrian classical pianists
American classical pianists
Male classical pianists
American male pianists
Austrian classical composers
American male classical composers
American classical composers
Jewish classical pianists
Second Viennese School
Lviv Conservatory alumni
Jewish emigrants from Austria to the United States after the Anschluss
Pupils of Arnold Schoenberg
20th-century classical composers
20th-century classical pianists
20th-century American pianists
20th-century American composers
20th-century American male musicians